Siberian Research Institute of Geology, Geophysics and Mineral Resources is a research institute in Tsentralny District of Novosibirsk, Russia. It was founded in 1957.

History
The research organization was established in 1957.

In 1960, the main scientific activity of the institute was associated with oil development in the West Siberian Lowland.

Scientific activity
Research institute is engaged in the mineral prospecting.

Number of employees
 1967 – 1048 employees (8 Doctors of Sciences, 71 Candidates of Sciences and 448 specialists with higher education);
 1996 – 569 employees;
 1999 – 613 employees;
 2007 – 700 employees (1 Academician, 22 Doctors of Sciences and 87 Candidates of Sciences).

Departments
 Krasny Avenue 67 (main department)
 Krasny Avenue 35
 Potaninskaya Street 6

Geological Museum
There is the Geological Museum at the Institute. It is located on Krasny Avenue 35.

References

External links
 Siberian Research Institute of Geology, Geophysics and Mineral Resources. SB RAS.

Research institutes in Novosibirsk
Research institutes established in 1957
Geology organizations
Tsentralny City District, Novosibirsk
Research institutes in the Soviet Union
1957 establishments in the Soviet Union
Petroleum in the Soviet Union